Ricardo Bernal (born March 30, 1970, in Mexico City) is a Mexican lyric tenor.

Biography 
Bernal started his vocal training at the age of 16 years at the National Conservatory of Music of Mexico under the direction of the soprano Irma Gonzalez and later by the professor in lyric singing, Enrique Jaso. He became a member of the Merola Opera Program in the San Francisco Opera House (USA) and the Opernstudio of Zurich (Switzerland). He also was trained by the mezzo-soprano Viorica Cortez in singing repertoire.

At 18 years old, he made his debut as "Beppe" in the opera I Pagliacci at the Palacio de Bellas Artes in Mexico City. At the beginning of his career, the fact of having easy top notes led him to successfully undertake Rossini's repertoire. However, later his voice developed an ample tessitura which enabled him to sing roles as a strong lyric tenor.

He was the winner of several contests including "Pacific voices" (San Francisco), "Kaffe Peters" (Viena), "Operalia" (Mexico) and Francisco Alonso (Madrid).

In 1996, he became the first soloist of the group of professional singers in Zurich and, the following year at the Teatre of Bonn and Trier until 2000 when he, at the same time, was invited to sing in famous theatres located in Berlin, Cologne, Hamburg and Baden-Baden, interpreting many diverse roles.

Presently, he is continuously performing in leading opera theaters in Costa Rica, Venezuela, Colombia, Argentina, Panama and Mexico.

He also has sung at Covent Garden, Copenhagen Opera House, La Fenice  in Venice, Teatro Filarmonico (Verona), Teatro di San Carlo (Naples), Teatro Politeama (Palermo), Teatro Massimo Bellini (Catania), San Francisco Opera House, Washington Opera, Opéra de Marseille and Montpellier among others. In Spain, he has sung in Las Palmas de Gran Canaria, Tenerife, Valladolid, Teatro Español of Madrid, Euskalduna Conference Centre and Concert Hall of Bilbao, the Liceu of Barcelona, and the Madrid Teatro Real.

He has sung next to well-known singers such as Mariella Devia, Sonia Ganassi, Dolora Zajick, Isabel Rey, Inva Mula, Patrizia Ciofi, Plácido Domingo, José Carreras, Juan Pons, Justino Díaz, Carlos Álvarez and Carlos Chausson. He has performed under the baton of directors such as Nello Santi, Pinchas Steinberg, Fabio Luisi, Pier Luigi Pizzi and Jean-Louis Pichon.

Repertoire

Opera
Giacomo Puccini
 La bohème – Rodolfo
 Gianni Schicchi – Rinuccio
 Madame Butterfly – Pinkerton
Vincenzo Bellini
 I Capuleti e i Montecchi – Tebaldo
 I puritani – Arturo
Giuseppe Verdi
 Rigoletto – Duque de Mantua
 La traviata – Rodolfo
 Un ballo in maschera – Riccardo
Gaetano Donizetti
 L'elisir d'amore – Nemorino
 Lucia di Lammermoor – Sir Edgardo de Ravenswood
 Maria Stuarda– Leicester
Gioachino Rossini
 Otello – Otello
 William Tell – Arnold 
Manuel Penella
 El gato montés – Rafael Ruiz
 Don Gil de Alcalá – Don Gil de Alcalá
Emilio Arrieta
 Marina – Jorge
Richard Strauss
 Der Rosenkavalier – Cantante italiano
Wolfgang Amadeus Mozart
 The Magic Flute – Tamino
 Don Giovanni – Don Ottavio

Operetta
Federico Moreno Torroba
 Luisa Fernanda – Aníbal
Amadeo Vives
 Doña Francisquita – Fernando
Pablo Sorozábal
 La Tabernera del Puerto – Leandro
 La Eterna Canción – Montilla

Discography 
 Carmina Burana by C. Orff (Mexico)
 Matilde di Shabran by G. Rossini (Germany)
 Gala Latina: Pópera (Spain)
 Goyescas by Granados (France)

External links 
 from the opera Rigoletto by Giuseppe Verdi
 from the opera La Bohème by Giacomo Puccini

 from the opera Werther by Jules Massenet
The tenor Ricardo Bernal triumphs in the Hall of Mirrors at the Liceo of Barcelona 
Ricardo Bernal Operabase

1970 births
Living people
Mexican operatic tenors
Singers from Mexico City
21st-century Mexican male opera singers
20th-century Mexican male opera singers